The European Juggling Convention (EJC), is the largest juggling convention in the world, regularly attracting several thousand participants. It is held every year in a different European country. It is organised by changing local organisation committees which are supported by the European Juggling Association (EJA), a non-profit association founded in 1987 in Saintes, France. Like most juggling conventions, it features a mix of workshops for jugglers, a "renegade" performance performed for participants, games, performances and a public show, usually spread out over a period of a week in the European summer. Accommodation is usually in the form of tents provided by participants.

History 

The first EJC was inspired by the IJA Festival and organised by jugglers who didn't want to travel to the USA. The IJA helped by giving the organisers a list (known as the roster) of IJA members living in Europe. It was also known as the "first European IJA mini-convention" and had an attendance of 11 jugglers from 5 countries. EJC has now grown much bigger than its inspiration and has much less focus on competitive juggling, but is more about the sharing of juggling.

List of European Juggling Conventions

See also 
British Juggling Convention
International Jugglers' Association
World Juggling Federation

References

External links 
 List of European Juggling Conventions
 European Juggling Association (EJA)
 EJC Data Pages 1978 - 2006

Juggling conventions
European culture
Recurring events established in 1978